Atike Sultan may refer to:
 Ayşe Atike Hanımsultan, daughter of Gevherhan Sultan and granddaughter of Sultan Selim II
 Burnaz Atike Sultan (1613–1674), Ottoman princess, daughter of Sultan Ahmed I
 Atike Sultan (1646–1686), Ottoman princess, daughter of Sultan Ibrahim I
 Atike Sultan, Ottoman princess, daughter of Sultan Ahmed II
 Atike Sultan (1712–1738), Ottoman princess, daughter of Sultan Ahmed III